Shanghai Sunfun Football Club is a professional Chinese football club that currently participates in the China League Two. The team is based in Shanghai.

History
The club was originally founded in 2012 as Shanghai Sun & Fun F.C.. On 30 December 2015, they changed their name to Shanghai Sunfun F.C..  They played in the 2016 China Amateur Football League and won the winners of 2016 Shanghai Chen Yi Cup and the first place of southeast region final–group A successively. Shanghai Sunfun finished the 4th place in the national finals and won promotion to 2017 China League Two.

In 2018, the club’s chairman and former football commentator, Zhou Liang, was arrested, and the club was dissolved afterwards.

Name history
2012–2015 Shanghai Sun & Fun F.C. 上海森梵
2015–2018 Shanghai Sunfun F.C. 上海申梵

Managerial history
  Cheng Liang (2016–2017)
  Teshima Atsushi (2018)
  Zhang Zhigang (2018)

Results
All-time league rankings

As of the end of 2018 season.

Key
<div>

 Pld = Played
 W = Games won
 D = Games drawn
 L = Games lost
 F = Goals for
 A = Goals against
 Pts = Points
 Pos = Final position

 DNQ = Did Not Qualify
 DNE = Did Not Enter
 NH = Not Held
 – = Does Not Exist
 R1 = Round 1
 R2 = Round 2
 R3 = Round 3
 R4 = Round 4

 F = Final
 SF = Semi-finals
 QF = Quarter-finals
 R16 = Round of 16
 Group = Group stage
 GS2 = Second Group stage
 QR1 = First Qualifying Round
 QR2 = Second Qualifying Round
 QR3 = Third Qualifying Round

References

Defunct football clubs in China
Football clubs in Shanghai
Association football clubs established in 2012
2012 establishments in China
Association football clubs disestablished in 2018
2018 disestablishments in China